The highest official of the subject of the Russian Federation, also known as the holder of the highest office of subject of the Russian Federation or the head of the highest executive body of state power of the subject of the Russian Federation and colloquially and collectively referred to as the title Governor ( - gubernator) or head of region ( - glava regiona), is the head and the chief executive of each of the federal subjects of Russia, not directly subordinate to the federal authorities, but the political and ceremonial head of the federal subject, all of which are equal constituent entities of Russia.

The office is defined by the Constitution of Russia and Chapters 1, 3 and 4 of Russia's Federal Law No. 184-FZ "On the General Principles of the Organization Of the Legislative (Representative) and Executive Organs Of State Power of the Subjects of the Russian Federation" which came into force in 1999. According to the current revision of the Russian Constitution, the Russian Federation consists of 83 federal subjects (including the six regions of Ukraine that are occupied by Russia, therefore there are 83 offices of head of region in Russia (see List of current heads of federal subjects of Russia).

The certain title of office is defined by the federal subject's Constitution or Charter. The names include: Governor, President ( - president), Head of Administration ( - glava administratsii), Head of Republic ( - glava respubliki), Mayor ( - mer), non-officially and collectively referred to as Governors for short. The official title "Governor" is most used in Russia and traditionally it is used in Oblasts of Russia. Presidents of Russia's republics, mayor of Moscow and mayor of St. Petersburg are also governors in this sense.

A head of the subject in Russia is said to serve a administration or executive office, colloquially referred to as gubernatorial administration.

Role and powers
The Constitution preserves the notion that the country is a federation of semi-sovereign federal subjects and that powers not specifically granted to the federal government are retained by the federal subjects. Federal subjects, therefore, are not administrative divisions. Regional governments in Russia are relatively powerful; each federal subject has its own independent criminal and civil law codes, as well as manages its internal government.

The governor thus heads the executive branch in the federal subjects and, depending on the individual jurisdiction, may have considerable control over government budgeting, the power of appointment of many officials (including many judges), and a considerable role in legislation. The governor may also have additional roles, and in many territories the governor has partial or absolute power to commute or pardon a criminal sentence. All governors serve five-year terms for no more than two terms in a row.

In all federal subjects, the governor is directly elected, and in most cases has considerable practical powers, though this may be moderated by the legislature and in some cases by other elected executive officials.

A governor may give an annual address about his achievements in order to satisfy a constitutional stipulation that a governor must report annually (or in older constitutions described as being "from time to time") on the territory or condition of the republic/oblast. Governors of oblasts may also perform ceremonial roles, such as greeting dignitaries, conferring state decorations, issuing symbolic proclamations. The governor may also have an official residence.

History

In modern Russia, the governor - is the highest official figure in the Russian Federation (territory, region, autonomous region, city), heads the executive branch in the Republics and oblasts of the Russian Federation.

On November 30, 1991, Presidential decree of Yeltsin, appointed Boris Nemtsov to the post of governor of the Nizhny Novgorod region in and the first week of work at the new location, Nemtsov then issued a decree according to which he, the head of the regional government, is to be officially called the governor. Thus, he became the first governor of the new Russia.

From 1995 to 2005, governors were elected by the residents of the Russian Federation in the framework of direct, equal and secret ballot. From 2005 to 2012, governors were appointed by the legislative (representative) bodies of subjects of the Russian Federation by the recommendation of the President of Russia.

On June 1, 2012, an Act came into force, which returns the direct election of senior officials in the regions. In 2015, governors were restricted to a term of five years, with no more than two consecutive terms.

Demographics

Party
As of September 2021 there are 57 members of United Russia, 3 Communists, 3 Liberal Democrats, two members of A Just Russia, and 20 independents serving as governors.

Tenure
For each term, governors serve five years in office.

The longest-serving current governor is Ramzan Kadyrov, the Head of the Chechen Republic, in office since 2007. Overall longest-serving governor is Yevgeny Savchenko of Belgorod Oblast, who has served seven consecutive terms from 1993 to 2020.

Gender

The first female governor was Valentina Bronevich who was governor of Koryak Autonomous Okrug from 1996 to 2000. There are currently 84 male state governors and one female governor: Natalya Komarova of Khanty–Mansi Autonomous Okrug.

External links
Президент подписал закон о сокращении сроков выдвижения и рассмотрения кандидатур высших должностных лиц субъектов Федерации
  Иванов В. В. Глава субъекта Российской Федерации. История губернаторов. Том I. История. Книга I. — М., 2019. — 600 с.
  Иванов В. В. Глава субъекта Российской Федерации. История губернаторов. Том I. История. Книга II. — М., 2019. — 624 с.

Government of Russia
Government occupations
Positions of authority